The 2019 Indian general election were scheduled to be held in seven phases between April and May 2019 to constitute the 17th Lok Sabha. The Election Commission of India announced the polling date for all the 26 Lok Sabha constituencies in Gujarat and it was held on April 23 during the third phase of 2019 Indian general election. The results were declared on 23 May 2019 across the country.

Party-wise results summary

Results- Constituency wise

Assembly segments wise lead of parties

Candidates
Election candidates are:

References

Indian general elections in Gujarat
2019 Indian general election by state or union territory
2010s in Gujarat